Md. Naosher Ali Sarkar (2 January 1949 – 8 April 2015) is a Bangladesh Nationalist Party politician and the former Member of Parliament of Natore-1.

Birth and early life 
Naosher Ali Sarkar was born on 2 January 1949 in Natore District.

Career
Sarkar took active part in the war of liberation in 1971. He was the chairman of Panka Union from 1972 to 1986. He was elected chairman of Bagatipara upazila from 2009 to 2014. He was elected to parliament from Natore-1 as a Jatiya Party candidate in 1988. He joined the Bangladesh Nationalist Party in 1996 and was elected vice-president of Natore district BNP.

Death 
Sarkar  died on 8 April 2015.

References 

Jatiya Party politicians
1949 births
4th Jatiya Sangsad members
2015 deaths
People from Natore District
Bangladesh Nationalist Party politicians